David "Tatu" Kolehmainen (10 September 1885 – 7 April 1918) was a Finnish wrestler. He competed in the lightweight event at the 1912 Summer Olympics.

During the Finnish Civil War Kolehmainen fought for the Red Guards and was killed in action at the Battle of Tampere.

References

External links
 

1885 births
1918 deaths
People from Eura
People from Turku and Pori Province (Grand Duchy of Finland)
Olympic wrestlers of Finland
Wrestlers at the 1912 Summer Olympics
Finnish male sport wrestlers
People of the Finnish Civil War (Red side)
Military personnel killed in action
Sportspeople from Satakunta